Sardurihinilli, also known as Haykaberd or Çavuştepe Kalesi, is an ancient Urartian fortified site located on a ridge on the northeastern edge of the village of Çavuştepe in the Gürpınar district of Van Province in eastern Turkey. It is located approximately 25 kilometers southeast of Van along the road leading to the city of Hakkâri, in a valley once known as Hayots Dzor in historic Armenia. It was founded by the Urartian king Sarduri II some time during his reign in the 8th century BC and is believed to be identical with the fortress of Sardurihurda mentioned in the same king's cuneiform inscriptions.

In Armenian folklore it is identified with Haykaberd or Haykʻ, the fortress built by Hayk, the legendary founder of the Armenian nation, close to the site where he slew the invading Babylonian king Bel.

Site 

Sardurihinilli has a linear plan, perched upon a ridge overlooking the Gürpınar Plain called Bol Dağı. It is composed of fortification walls as well as the remains of an Urartian royal palace, built between 764 and 735 BC during the reign of King Sarduri II at the climax of power of the Urartian Empire. There are upper and lower sections of the fortress in which the Temple of Khaldi or Irmushini, citadel walls, king's tower, workshops (7th century BC), storehouses, cisterns, kitchen, palace with a throne room, "royal" toilet, harem and colonnaded halls were located. A moat surrounded sections of the fortress.

The fortress stands out by the high quality of its masonry, which, in the view of C. A. Burney, suggests that it was "a wealthy town, of which only the acropolis remains to this day." Aside from the cyclopean wall, the blocks used in the fortress are smoothly finished and fit exactly together without mortar being used.

If Sardurihinilli is to be identified with Sardurihurda, then it is located near the site of a city called Ulhu, which Assyrian inscriptions say Sargon II conquered during his campaign against Urartu, although it seems Sardurihurda did not fall to the Assyrians.

Four Urartian cuneiform inscriptions have been discovered at Sardurihinilli, of which the best preserved one reads as follows:

Sardurihinilli was destroyed in the 7th century BC, presumably by the Scythians or Medes. Traces of a later medieval occupation exist. In 1884, a cuneiform inscription from the site was taken to Vienna and published by D. H. Müller. Nikolai Marr and Joseph Orbeli visited the site in 1916 and collected some artifacts that are now located at the Hermitage. Christopher Lehmann-Haupt was the first to conduct excavations at the site and draw up a sketch-plan of the fortress. C. A. Burney visited the site in 1956 and published a brief description and sketch-plan of the fortress. The site was excavated between 1961 and 1986 by Afif Erzen.

Notes

Sources 
 Belli, O. (2001). Çavuştepe (Šardurḫinili) Excavations. In: O. Belly (ed.): İstanbul University’s Contributions to Archaeology in Turkey 1932-2000. Istanbul, pp. 173–178.
 
 Erzen, A. (1978). Çavuştepe I. M. Ö. 7.-6. Yüzyil Urartu Mımarlik Antilari ve Ortaçağ Nekropolü. Ankara.
 Erzen, A. (1978): Ausgrabungen auf der urartäischen Burg Çavuştepe im Gebiet von Van. In: E. Akurgal (ed.): The Proceedings of the Xth International Congress of Classical Archaeology, Ankara-İzmir, 23-30.9.1973. Ankara, pp. 55–59.

See also

 Urartu
 Hayk
 Bel (mythology)

External links 
 Map of Haykaberd

Photos 
 Haykaberd/Cavustepe 
 Photos of Haykaberd/Cavustepe 

Urartian cities
Archaeological sites in Eastern Anatolia
Archaeology of Armenia